The second season of Your Face Sounds Familiar was a singing and impersonation competition for celebrities on ABS-CBN. Sharon Cuneta, Gary Valenciano and Jed Madela reprise their duties as judges. Billy Crawford also returns as host; however, he is accompanied by Melai Cantiveros, the winner of the first season.

The show replaced the second season of The Voice Kids and began airing on September 12, 2015.

After 14 weeks, Denise Laurel emerged as the winner after garnering 27.51% of the public's votes. Laurel is the only contestant who did not win in any weekly competition of the show, meaning she received no prizes before the conclusion of the grand showdown.

Development
On June 6, 2015, during the first season's grand showdown it was announced that the show will return for a second season. It premiered on September 12, 2015, taking over the time slot vacated of the then-recently concluded second season of The Voice Kids.

In August 2015, Melai Cantiveros, the winner of the first season was announced to co-host the show, impersonating different icons. Sharon Cuneta, Gary Valenciano, Jed Madela, and Billy Crawford were reported to return to the show to reprise their duties.

The performers for the show were revealed during the finals weekend of the second season of The Voice Kids.

On November 14, 2015, the show moved its timeslot to 9:30 p.m. on Saturdays and 9:15 p.m. on Sundays after Pinoy Big Brother: 737 ended in order to give its original timeslot to Dance Kids.

Hosts, Judges and Mentors

Hosts
Billy Crawford returns as the main host with season 1 winner Melai Cantiveros joining him as a host, impersonating different icons each week.

Judges
The judges, dubbed as "The Jury" in the show:
The Jury
 Sharon Cuneta
 Gary Valenciano
 Jed Madela

Guest judges
Boy Abunda (Madela's replacement judges for Week 3)
Georcelle Dapat of G-Force & Annie Quintos of The Company (Cuneta's replacement judges for Week 6 and 13)
Rico J. Puno and Karla Estrada (Madela's replacement judges for Week 10)
Randy Santiago (Madela's replacement judges for Week 11)

Mentors
Annie Quintos of The Company served as the mentor for vocals while Georcelle Dapat of G-Force served as the mentor for choreography and movement.

Performers
The contestants and their monikers were revealed on August 29, 2015, during the finals of the second season  of The Voice Kids.

Results summary
The table below shows the corresponding total points earned per week. Each performance is ranked in two parts. In the first part, The Jury gives 1, 2, 3, 4, 5, 6, 7 and 8 points to the performers respectively. In the second part, all of the performers give 3 points to another contestant other than him or her.

Legend

Performances

Week 1 (September 12 & 13) 
Non-competition performance
 Melai Cantiveros as Madonna – "Papa Don't Preach"
Episode hashtag
 #YFSFNewSeason (Saturday)
 #AllNewYFSF (Sunday)

Week 2 (September 19 & 20)
Non-competition impersonator
 Melai Cantiveros as Dionisia Pacquiao 
Episode hashtag
 #YFSFAngSaya (Saturday)
 #SayaNgYFSF (Sunday)

Week 3 (September 26 & 27)
Non-competition impersonator
 Melai Cantiveros as Georcelle Dapat of G-Force
Episode hashtag
 #YFSFIkawNa (Saturday)
 #YFSFHumBam (Sunday)
Guest juror
 Boy Abunda (replacement for Jed Madela)

Week 4 (October 3 & 4)
Non-competition impersonator
 Melai Cantiveros as Boy Abunda
Episode hashtag
 #YFSFEksklusibo (Saturday)
 #YFSFNowNa (Sunday)

Week 5 (October 10 & 11)
Non-competition impersonator
 Melai Cantiveros as Kim Atienza
Episode hashtags
 #YFSFSaturdate (Saturday)
 #YFSFSundate (Sunday)

Week 6 (October 17 & 18)
Guest jurors 
 Georcelle Dapat of G-Force & Annie Quintos of The Company (replacement for Sharon Cuneta) (2 in 1 judge, score counts as 1)
Episode hashtag
 #YFSFVersatile

Week 7 (October 24 & 25)
Non-competition impersonator
 Melai Cantiveros as Doris Bigornia
Episode hashtag
 #YFSFPangMasa (Saturday)
 #YFSFPampamilya (Sunday)

Week 8 (October 31 & November 1)
Non-competition impersonator
 Melai Cantiveros as Charky (Chucky from Child's Play)
Episode Hashtag

 #YFSFGoosebumps (Saturday)
 #YFSFKilabot (Sunday)

Week 9 (November 7 & 8)
Owing to the Big Night of Pinoy Big Brother: 737, the show was aired on 10:45 PM on Saturday and at 10:15 PM on Sunday rather than the regular timeslot.

Non-competition impersonator
 Melai Cantiveros as Vilma Santos

Episode Hashtags
 #YFSF4AllSeasons (Saturday)
 #YFSFGrandSlam (Sunday)

Week 10 (November 14 & 15)
This episode was the first episode to air at a later timeslot of 9:30 PM on Saturdays/9:15 PM on Sundays after the timeslot was changed to give way to Dance Kids.
Week's Challenge
 Duet with and impersonate an OPM icon

Non-competition impersonator
 Melai Cantiveros as Billy Crawford

Guest jurors
 Rico J. Puno and Karla Estrada (replacement for Jed Madela)
Episode Hashtags

 #YFSFOPMFaceOff (Saturday)
 #YFSFOPMHarapan (Sunday)

Week 11 (November 21 & 22)
Week's Challenge
 Duet with and impersonate an OPM band leader

Non-competition impersonator
Melai Cantiveros as Pepe Smith of Juan de la Cruz Band

Guest juror
Randy Santiago (replacement for Jed Madela)
Episode Hashtags
 #YFSFRocks (Saturday)
 #YFSFJams (Sunday)

Notes

 Owing to a four-way tie between Sam Conception, Kean Cipirano, Denise Laurel, and KZ Tandingan, the Jury collectively selected a winner (Cipirano) between those whom are tied.

Week 12 (November 28 & 29)
Week's Challenge
 Duet with the season 1 contestants

Episode hashtags
 #YFSFAllStar (Saturday)
 #YFSFHomecoming (Sunday)

Week 13 (December 5 & 6)
Week's Challenge
 Duet with oneself

Episode hashtags
 #YFSFDuetYourself (Saturday)
 #YFSFFinal4 (Sunday)

Non-competition impersonator
 Melai Cantiveros as Miley Cyrus

Guest jurors
 Georcelle Dapat of G-Force & Annie Quintos of The Company (replacement for Sharon Cuneta) (2 in 1 judge, score counts as 1)

The Grand Showdown: Week 14 (December 12 & 13)
The Grand Showdown was held on December 12–13, 2015 at the Newport Performing Arts Theater, Resorts World Manila. The finalists were given the chance to impersonate an icon of their choice.

Since Laurel and Pangilinan tied for the fourth slot for the finals, both advanced to the finale adding an additional fifth finalist to the Grand Showdown. As Sarrosa, Nicolas and Bautista accumulated the fewest points prior to the finale, they were excluded from the finale, and instead performed as the Bee Gees in the following night as a non-competition performance.

Episode hashtags
 #YFSF2GrandShowdown (Saturday)
 #YFSF2GrandWinner (Sunday)

Non-competition performances
December 13
 Jed Madela, Sharon Cuneta and Gary Valenciano - "Christmas Medley"
 Eric Nicolas, Kakai Bautista and Myrtle Sarrosa –  as Maurice Gibb, Robin Gibb and Barry Gibb of Bee Gees – "Night Fever"/"Stayin' Alive"/"Tragedy"

Television ratings
Television ratings for Your Face Sounds Familiar on ABS-CBN were gathered from two major sources, namely from AGB Nielsen and Kantar Media. AGB Nielsen's survey ratings were gathered from Mega Manila households, while Kantar Media's survey ratings were gathered from urban and rural households all over the Philippines.

References

External links
 Your Face Sounds Familiar on ABS-CBN

Your Face Sounds Familiar (Philippine TV series)
2015 Philippine television seasons